The 1909 Rhode Island gubernatorial election was held on November 2, 1909. Incumbent Republican Aram J. Pothier defeated Democratic nominee Olney Arnold with 57.00% of the vote.

General election

Candidates
Major party candidates
Aram J. Pothier, Republican
Olney Arnold, Democratic

Other candidates
Willis H. White, Prohibition
Frederick W. Hurst, Socialist
Richard Holland, Socialist Labor

Results

References

1909
Rhode Island
1909 Rhode Island elections